Carlos Ramón Mendoza (born November 4, 1974) is a former professional baseball outfielder from Venezuela.

Career
Mendoza previously played parts of two seasons in the majors with the New York Mets (1997) and Colorado Rockies (2000), primarily as an outfielder. Listed at 5.11 , 160 lb , Mendoza batted and threw left-handed. He was born in Ciudad Bolívar, Venezuela.

In a two-season MLB career, Mendoza hit .182 with one run batted in and no home runs in 28 games played.

In between, Mendoza played winterball with the Navegantes del Magallanes and Caribes de Oriente clubs of the Venezuelan League from 1994 through 2004. In addition, he represented his country in the 1999 Caribbean Series tournament, where he led all hitters with a .529 average and was included in the All-Star team.

Sources

See also
 List of Major League Baseball players from Venezuela

External links
, or Retrosheet, or Pelota Binaria

1974 births
Living people
Amarillo Dillas players
Binghamton Mets players
Capital City Bombers players
Caribes de Oriente players
Colorado Rockies players
Colorado Springs Sky Sox players
Durham Bulls players
Gulf Coast Devil Rays players
Kingsport Mets players
Major League Baseball outfielders
Major League Baseball players from Venezuela
Minor league baseball managers
Navegantes del Magallanes players
New York Mets players
Norfolk Tides players
Orlando Rays players
People from Ciudad Bolívar
Rio Grande Valley WhiteWings players
Saraperos de Saltillo players
St. Petersburg Devil Rays players
T & A San Marino players
Venezuelan expatriate baseball players in Mexico
Venezuelan expatriate baseball players in the United States
Venezuelan expatriate baseball players in San Marino